is a railway station on the West Japan Railway Company (JR West) Tōkaidō Main Line (JR Kyōto Line) in Ōyamazaki, Otokuni District, Kyoto Prefecture, Japan.

History
The station opened on 9 August 1876.

Station numbering was introduced to the station in March 2018 with Nagaokakyō being assigned station number JR-A36.

Structure
There are ticket machines and ticket gates in the lower level than two island platforms with four tracks.

Around the station
Bus stop for Keihan Bus (Operated for Kyoto Racecourse when JRA Horse Racing is held)
Bus stop for Keihan City Bus (Route 13 for Keihan )
Bus stop for Hankyu Bus (Route 18 for Hankyu  and JR Nagaokakyo via Oyamazaki Town Hall, Koizumibashi and Tomooka)
Oyamazaki Station (Hankyu Railway Kyoto Line)
Suntory Yamazaki Distillery

Adjacent stations

References

Railway stations in Japan opened in 1876
Railway stations in Kyoto Prefecture